Donald Fraser McMiken (born 20 May 1942) is an Australian modern pentathlete. He competed at the 1964 and 1968 Summer Olympics.

References

1942 births
Living people
Australian male modern pentathletes
Olympic modern pentathletes of Australia
Modern pentathletes at the 1964 Summer Olympics
Modern pentathletes at the 1968 Summer Olympics